Leptolalax hamidi is a frog species in the family Megophryidae. It is endemic to Borneo, where it can be found both in western Sarawak, Malaysia, and Kalimantan, Indonesia. Its natural habitats are tropical moist lowland hilly forests and rivers. It is threatened by habitat loss (logging).

Description
Among Leptolalax, Leptolalax hamidi is among the larger species: male measure  in snout-vent length and females  in SVL. It has a slender head and body. Its back, including on top of snout, is clearly marked with discrete blotches; chest and abdomen are without large dark markings.

References

hamidi
Amphibians of Borneo
Amphibians of Indonesia
Amphibians of Malaysia
Endemic fauna of Borneo
Amphibians described in 1997
Taxa named by Masafumi Matsui
Taxonomy articles created by Polbot
Taxobox binomials not recognized by IUCN